Guru Gobind Singh Foundation was set up in 1978 by the prominent and illustrious Punjabi residents of Nasik with the primary objective of providing quality education to the students irrespective of their caste, creed, religion or nationality so as to promote morality, patriotism, self-respect and self-confidence.

Courses
GGSP offers diploma engineering studies in five disciplines:
 Civil Engineering
 Mechanical Engineering (Shift 1 & 2)
 Electronics and Telecommunication Engineering
 Computer Engineering
 Electrical Engineering
 Mechatronics Engineering

Campus
The campus is nestled in an spacious 12 acres education complex, with Ultra-modern Laboratories, Workshops, Classrooms, vast Playgrounds Gymnasium and Cafeteria.

Admission
Admission to the diploma courses is through the CAP rounds conducted by DTE, Maharashtra (Based on SSC scores).

References
https://web.archive.org/web/20100817235056/http://www.dte.org.in/institutes/Public/RegionCourseInfo.aspx?PK_UserID=5240
https://web.archive.org/web/20120331102056/http://msbte.com/website/pdfdocs/News2011/State%20Level%20Technical%20Project%20Exhibition%20(Techno%20Feat-2011)%20.pdf
http://www.ggsf.edu.in
http://www.msbte.org/

External links 
 

Universities and colleges in Maharashtra
Education in Nashik
Engineering colleges in Maharashtra
Educational institutions established in 1978
1978 establishments in Maharashtra
Memorials to Guru Gobind Singh